Khalil Al Ali (Arabic:خليل آل علي) (born 21 December 1984) is an Emirati footballer. He currently plays as a defender.

External links

References

Emirati footballers
1984 births
Living people
Al Jazirah Al Hamra Club players
Dibba FC players
Al Dhafra FC players
Masafi Club players
Al-Ittihad Kalba SC players
Emirates Club players
Al Rams Club players
UAE First Division League players
UAE Pro League players
Association football defenders